Zara Viktoria Leghissa (born 1970) is a Swedish politician and member of the Riksdag, the national legislature. A member of the Social Democratic Party, she has represented Norrbotten County since September 2022.

Leghissa worked as a nursing assistant in a nursing home. She was a member of the board of the Northern Sweden branch of the Swedish Trade Union Confederation (LO). She is a member of the municipal council in Boden Municipality.

References

1970 births
Living people
Members of the Riksdag 2022–2026
Members of the Riksdag from the Social Democrats
People from Boden Municipality
Women members of the Riksdag
21st-century Swedish women politicians